Floda may refer to:
Floda, Gagnef, an urban area in Gagnef Municipality, Sweden
Floda, Lerum, an urban area in Lerum Municipality, Sweden
Flodafors, a small settlement in Katrineholm Municipality, Sweden